A prostitute is a person who engages in prostitution (human sexual behavior in exchange for money, goods or other reasons).

Prostitute or Prostitution may also refer to:

 Prostitute (1927 film), Soviet drama film
 Prostitute (1980 film), British film
 Prostitute (Alphaville album), 1994
 Prostitute, a Neuroticfish EP
 Prostitute (Toyah album), 1988
 "Prostitute" (song), from the album Chinese Democracy
 The Prostitute, a 1937 novel by Ko Surangkhanang
 The Prostitutes, an indie band
 Prostitution (1919 film), German silent film
 Prostitution (1963 film), French film